Trinidad Secundino Morales Vargas (born 16 June 1957) is a Mexican politician affiliated with the PRD. As of 2013 he served as Deputy of the LXII Legislature of the Mexican Congress representing the Federal District. He is a former member of the Communist League.

References

1957 births
Living people
People from Chihuahua City
Mexican communists
Party of the Democratic Revolution politicians
21st-century Mexican politicians
Deputies of the LXII Legislature of Mexico
Members of the Chamber of Deputies (Mexico) for Mexico City